The Dark Divide is the largest roadless area in western Washington state, comprising approximately 76,000 acres (310 km2) of intact wilderness on Juniper Ridge linking Mount St. Helens and Mount Adams in the southern Cascade Mountains of Washington.  In two remote valleys of the Lewis River drainage are 500-year-old trees. These ancient forests are protected from logging as reserves for the northern spotted owl and other species under the Northwest Forest Plan. 

Downstream of the confluence of Quartz Creek, the Lewis River plunges over four large waterfalls.  Curly Creek, another tributary, is the only cataract in Washington with an intact natural stone bridge,  and the early formation of a second natural bridge can be observed.   

Although the Dark Divide is largely composed of black basalt, features such as 5,238-foot (1,596 m) Dark Mountain, Dark Creek and Dark Meadows are actually named for John Dark, a 19th-century gold prospector and speculator.

Gallery

Sources
Pyle, Robert Michael, Where Bigfoot Walks: Crossing the Dark Divide, Houghton Mifflin, 1995, 
Washington’s Dark Divide Roadless Area

Regions of Washington (state)
Gifford Pinchot National Forest